Sense Bank is one of the largest Ukrainian commercial banks; it is a member of the international private investment holding company — ABH Holdings S.A. (ABHH), headquartered in Luxembourg. On December 1, 2022, the name of "Alfa-Bank Ukraine" has changed to Sense Bank. According to the National Bank of Ukraine, the bank was founded in 1993 and as of 2021, it is on the list of top 10 largest financial institutions in the country by asset size. The bank is a member of the Deposit Guarantee Fund  and it is identified as a systemically important bank in Ukraine.

Sense Bank has become a part of the joint banking network POWER BANKING, created at the NBU's initiative. It means that 74 critical branches of Sense Bank will operate even during long-term blackouts. All of them are equipped with alternative energy sources and backup communication channels.

According to the NBU, as of December 1, 2021, the bank's assets amounted to UAH 111 billion. According to the bank, at the end of 2021, the bank had 201 branches and 686 ATMs (198 of them with NFC). As of July 18, 2022, the bank served over 3 million individual customers, 55,000 companies, and 82,000 sole proprietors; a number of bank employees was almost 5,000.

As of April 21, 2022, the ultimate beneficial owners, who have a substantial ownership interest in Alfa-Bank Ukraine through the holding companies—a 57.6% stake through ABH Holdings S.A. (Luxembourg) and a 42.4% stake through ABH Ukraine Limited (Cyprus), were as follows:
 native of Lviv, Ukrainian–Russian–Israeli businessman Mikhail Fridman⁣ — 32.86%; 
 citizen of Russia and the Republic of Latvia Petr Aven⁣ — 12.4%; 
 Russian businessman Andrey Kosogov — 40.96%.

On April 21, 2022, the National Bank of Ukraine approved the appointment of Simeon Djankov as the authorized person entitled to vote the shares of the shareholders not considered to have an impeccable reputation as well as to manage in some way the bank's affairs. Now, Simeon Djankov is involved in management of the bank within the scope of powers conferred on him and as prescribed by law.

According to the authorized person, the management board of Bank has resolved to reject the Alfa-Bank brand and continue to operate under a new brand. “A few days after the outbreak of war, the Board decided to dissociate itself from the Alfa-Bank brand. The bank does not want to bear any relation to the aggressor country, even at the level of associations or connections that link to the brand operating in Russia,” said Simeon Djankov.

History 

Alfa-Bank Ukraine was founded on 24 March 1993 as a limited liability company named Consumer-Assisting Commercial Bank Vito, having its head office in Kyiv. Subsequent names: Kyivinvestbank (since 25 March 1996); JSCB Kyivinvestbank (since 15 April 1998); CJSC Alfa-Bank (since 26 January 2001); CJSC ALFA-BANK (since 2 October 2006); PJSC ALFA-BANK (since 21 July 2009); PJSC ALFA-BANK (since 15 February 2013); JSC ALFA-BANK (since 6 July 2018).

In 2001, the bank became a member of the SWIFT system and an associated member of the VISA International. In the same year, the bank became a member of PFTS Stock Exchange and has been a member of its Council since August 2004.

On 26 December 2006, Alfa-Bank (Russia) sold its share in Alfa-Bank (Ukraine) to ABH Ukraine Limited. As of 1 January 2021, ABH Holdings S.A. owned 57.6% of the bank's shares, and ABH Ukraine Limited owned 42.4% of the bank's shares. However, beneficial shareholders of Alfa-Bank Ukraine have remained unchanged.

By 2006, the bank had transformed into a full-service bank with a strong presence in the corporate banking sector. The bank is simultaneously stepping up its presence in the retail banking sector.

In 2009, Closed Joint-Stock Company Alfa-Bank (CJSC Alfa-Bank) was renamed to Public Joint-Stock Company Alfa-Bank (PJSC Alfa-Bank), and in 2018, it was renamed to Private Joint-Stock Company Alfa-Bank.

From 2016 until October 2019, ABHH Group consolidated its assets in Ukraine (Alfa-Bank and Ukrsotsbank), which resulted in the establishment of one of the largest private banks in Ukraine.

On 17 March 2020, due to the increased demand for foreign cash and limited supply of currency notes in Ukraine, Alfa-Bank temporarily suspended the sale of foreign cash in 45 branches of the bank during the day.

On November 26, 2020, Alfa-Bank Ukraine launched digital banking app—Sense SuperApp (mobile application), where natural persons and sole-proprietors can get services at the same time. Over a year, more than 1.4 million of the bank's customers became app users.

In early 2021, Sense SuperApp digital banking app made it possible to go through quick identification via the Diia app and apply for debit or credit card.

In March 2021, Alfa-Bank Ukraine and Ukrainian telecom operator Kyivstar started strategic cooperation to provide convergent banking and telecommunications services in one place. The financial institution and the telecom operator have merged bank and mobile accounts in Sense SuperApp digital banking app.

In August 2021, Caméléon digital card became available in Sense SuperApp: a card with endless grace period and 0.01% on purchases at the expense of credit means. From October 2021, one can get Caméléon debit and credit card in Kyivstar brand stores.

In December 2021, Alfa-Bank Ukraine began paying UAH 1,000 to those who have passed the full course of vaccination, to eSupport card which can be applied for in Sense SuperApp digital banking app.

At the end of 2021, Alfa-Bank initiated the access of shares to circulation on the Ukrainian market and provided customers with a trading tool in Sense SuperApp digital banking app. During the pilot phase that lasted from December 28, 2021, to January 10, 2022, the trading volume amounted to over UAH 18 million.

On July 11, 2022, it was officially announced that Alfa-Bank will be rebranding to Sense Bank. The bank rebranded to Sense, their mobile bank of the same name, created in 2020.

In October 2022, one of the main co-owners of the bank, Mikhail Fridman, on behalf of the shareholders, sent a letter to the chairman of the National Bank of Ukraine with a proposal to transfer the shares to the state. As an alternative measure, an additional capitalization of the bank by $1 billion was proposed.

Owners 

Information about the ultimate key shareholders in the bank's ownership structure as of 1 January 2021:

No. / Shareholder / Percent of shares
 Andrey Nikolaevich Kosogov (a citizen of Russia) — 40.96%
 Mikhail Maratovich Fridman (born in Lviv, a citizen of Russia and Israel, residing in the United Kingdom) — 32.86%
 Petr Olegovich Aven (a citizen of Russia) — 12.40%
 UniCredit S.p.A. — 9.9%
 The Mark Foundation for Cancer Research — 3.87%

Management board 
As of March 15, 2023:
Alla Komisarenko — Chairperson of the Management Board
Andrii Hrytseniuk — Executive Director for Information Technology and Retail Business, Member of the Management Board
Oleksii Savenko — Member of the Management Board, Chief Accountant, Head of Accounting & Reporting Unit
Kateryna Polovko —   Member of the Management Board, Operations Unit
Polina Kharchenko — Member of the Management Board, Compliance and Financial Monitoring Director
Serhii Chornoivan — Member of the Management Board for Non-Performing Assets

Awards 
In March 2021, Alfa-Bank was named the best bank in Ukraine by Global Finance.

In this same year, the international magazine Global Finance recognized Alfa-Bank as the winner in The Best Consumer Digital Bank in Ukraine category - for the best digital banking of the country at the annual World's Best Consumer Digital Banks Awards in Central & Eastern Europe 2021.

Global Finance also named Alfa-Bank as the best SME-bank in Ukraine at the SME Bank Awards 2022 and A-Club private banking division received the Best Private Bank Award for the second year in a row.

On November 26, 2021, to celebrate the first anniversary of Sense SuperApp digital banking app, Alfa-Bank Ukraine in partnership with Mastercard held the world's first online concert of the Ukrainian artist MONATIK via the mobile app. This concert entered the Ukrainian book of records.

In 2022, Sense Bank has been awarded Bank of the Year 2022 for Ukraine by The Banker, a leading international publication.

Andrii Hrytseniuk, Chief Information Officer at Alfa-Bank Ukraine, was named as the best CIO in the world by The Banker

Sense Bank received The Banker's Global Innovation in Digital Banking Award

Sense Bank was recognized as the best Ukrainian digital bank according to Ukrainian Fintech Awards

Social initiatives 
In 2011–2017, Alfa-Bank was a partner of the first international jazz festival in Lviv, Alfa Jazz Fest. In 7 years, the bank's initiative allowed for establishing an international music festival that has become an independent cultural event in Ukraine and, since 2018, after the rebranding, has been held under the name “Leopolis Jazz Fest”.

The bank was a Special Partner of the Ukrainian Lunch within the framework of the World Economic Forum in Davos as well as a Partner of the 9th Yalta Annual Meeting (YES) entitled “Ukraine and the World: Addressing Tomorrow’s Challenges Together” and the 10th Yalta Annual Meeting “Changing Ukraine in a Changing World: Factors of Success”.
In 2019, Alfa-Bank (Ukraine) has become a member of the UN Global Compact Network in Ukraine.

Since the imposition of martial law, 104 million hryvnias of Alfa-Bank Ukraine's budget have been allocated to the needs of the Armed Forces of Ukraine and territorial defense units . In particular, 10 million hryvnias in targeted funding were delivered to the Armed Forces of Ukraine during the first days of hostilities. Moreover, Alfa-Bank Ukraine has supplied military accoutrements, food, generators, tactical gear, medicines, one armored vehicle, thermal imaging cameras, etc. to TDUs and the Armed Forces of Ukraine.

During only 13 days of the war, Alfa-Bank Ukraine's employees and individual clients jointly raised over UAH 115 million in charitable donations for AFU and TDUs through Sense SupperApp mobile app.

You can make donations to the Armed Forces of Ukraine via Sense SupperApp digital banking app. The easy-to-use options, “Support for the Armed Forces of Ukraine” and “Support for Victims”, let you pay with one click; financial contributions may be also made from the єPіdtrimka (eSupport) card.

References 

Ukrainian companies established in 1993
Banks of Ukraine
Mikhail Fridman